The 2022 Cork Intermediate A Hurling Championship was the third staging of the Cork Intermediate A Hurling Championship and the 113th staging overall of a championship for middle-ranking intermediate hurling teams in Cork. The draw for the group stage placings took place on 8 February 2022. The championship ran from 29 July to 9 October 2022.

The final was played on 9 October 2022 at Páirc Uí Chaoimh in Cork, between Cloughduv and Dungourney, in what was their first ever meeting in the final. Dungourney won the match by 1-16 to 0-13 to claim their first ever championship title.

Team changes

To Championship

Promoted from the Cork Lower Intermediate Hurling Championship
 Lisgoold

Relegated from the Cork Premier Intermediate Hurling Championship
 Aghada

From Championship

Promoted to the Cork Premier Intermediate Hurling Championship
 Castlemartyr

Relegated to the Cork Premier Junior Hurling Championship
 Glen Rovers

Group A

Group A table

Group A results

Group B

Group B table

Group B results

Group C

Group C table

Group C results

Knockout stage

Bracket

Relegation playoff

Quarter-finals

Semi-finals

Final

References

External link

 Cork GAA website

Cork Senior A Hurling Championship
Cork Intermediate Hurling Championship